Much Brass is an album by jazz cornetist Nat Adderley released on the Riverside label featuring performances by Adderley's Sextet with Slide Hampton, Wynton Kelly, Sam Jones, Laymon Jackson, and Albert Heath.

Reception
The Allmusic review awarded the album 4 stars. 
The Penguin Guide to Jazz awarded the album 3 stars, stating: "Some interesting arrangements here, presumably largely the work of Hampton, and some delicately interwoven playing which largely belies the bluster implied in the title.... Not immediately identifiable as a 'typical' Nat Adderley record, but a beautiful statement all the same."

Track listing
All compositions by Nat Adderley except as indicated
 "Blue Concept" (Gigi Gryce) - 7:37  
 "Little Miss" (Buddy DeSylva, George Gershwin) - 4:28  
 "Israel" (Johnny Carisi) - 3:53  
 "What Next?" - 3:20  
 "Moving" - 5:03  
 "Blue Brass Groove" (Nat Adderley, Julian "Cannonball" Adderley) - 5:39  
 "Accents" - 5:40  
 "Sometimes I Feel Like a Motherless Child" (Traditional) - 4:06  
Recorded in New York City on March 23 & 27, 1959

Personnel
Nat Adderley – cornet 
Slide Hampton - tuba (track 1), trombone (tracks 2-7) 
Wynton Kelly - piano
Sam Jones - bass (tracks 2-8), cello (track 1)
Laymon Jackson - bass (track 1), tuba (tracks 2-8)
Albert Heath - drums

References

1959 albums
Riverside Records albums
Nat Adderley albums